A New Day Yesterday (2003), also known as Jethro Tull: A New Day Yesterday – 25th Anniversary Collection, 1969-1994, is a stereo DVD remastering of 25th Anniversary Video by Jethro Tull. The collection is named for the opening track from the band's 1969 album Stand Up.

Track listing 
 Introduction / Living In The Past (live) – Brussels 1993 
 Nothing Is Easy (live) – Isle of Wight 1970 
 25th Anniversary Reunion 
 Teacher (live) French TV 1970 
 The Witch's Promise (live) – BBC Top Of The Pops 1970 
 The Story Of The Hare Who Lost His Spectacles 
 Minstrel In The Gallery (live) – Paris 1975 
 Aqualung (live) – BBC Sight & Sound 1977 
 Thick As A Brick Rehearsal/ Thick As . . . (live) – Madison Square Garden 1978 
 Songs From The Wood (live) – London 1980 
 Too Old To Rock N Roll . . . – Promo video clip 1980 
 Kissing Willie – Promo video clip 1989 
 25th Anniversary Tour Rehearsals / My God 
 Rocks On The Road – Promo video 1991 
 A New Day Yesterday (live) – Promo video 
 Teacher (live) – French TV 1970 [complete performance] 
 The Witch's Promise (live) – BBC Top Of The Pops 1970 [complete performance]
 The Story Of The Hare Who Lost His Spectacles – Passion Play Tour 1973 
 Aqualung (live) – BBC Sight & Sound 1977 [complete performance]
 Kissing Willie – full promo video 1989 
 Rocks On The Road – full promo video 1991 
 Living In The Past (live) – Brussels 1993 [complete performance]

See also 
 20 Years of Jethro Tull (1988)

External links 
 A New Day Yesterday at Allmovie''
 A New Day Yesterday (collecting-tull.com)
 Official Site
 Review by Benjy Eisen March 30, 2004

Jethro Tull (band) video albums
2003 video albums
Live video albums
2003 live albums